The Malta Self-Government Re-introduction Seventy-Fifth Anniversary Medal is a national commemorative medal of the Republic of Malta. The medal was established 14 May 1996 to commemorate the establishment, within the Crown Colony of Malta, of self-government and the Parliament of Malta. The medal is awarded to individuals who have served as a Member of the Senate, Legislative Assembly, or House of Representatives since 1 November 1921. Recipients must have been living on 7 June 1996. Those who were members of the House of Representatives are eligible for award of the medal once they cease being members of that body.

Appearance
The obverse of the medal depicts the Coat of arms of Malta. The reverse bears the year 1921 surrounded by a wreath of oak leaves bound at the top, bottom, and sides. Encircling the wreath is the inscription RE-INTRODUZZJONI TA' GVERN RESPONSABBLI * IL-ĦAMSA U SEBGĦIN ANNIVERSARJU * 1996 * in relief. It is green with two narrow  stripes in the center of white and red. The medal attached to the ribbon by a bar-type suspension. On the bar is a design, in relief, of an olive branch and palm frond joined at the middle. Recipients' names are engraved on the rim of the medal.

Notable recipients
The following individuals were awarded the Malta Self-Government Re-introduction Seventy-Fifth Anniversary Medal:
Wistin Abela
Agatha Barbara, K.U.O.M.
H.E. Dr Ugo Mifsud Bonnici, K.U.O.M.
Prof. Edwin Busuttil
Magistrate Joe Cassar
Dr Joseph Cefai
H.E. Prof Guido de Marco, K.U.O.M.
John Dalli
Michael Falzon
Joe Grima
Judge Fortunato Mizzi
Dr Josie Muscat
Dr Daniel Piscopo, U.O.M.
Dr Frank Portelli
Dr Joseph Spiteri
Lino Spiteri
Dr Censu Tabone,K.U.O.M.

In 2011, Frank Portelli asked for his name to be removed from the list of recipients, in protest at the award of a Maltese Honour to Muammar Gaddafi of Libya.

References

Orders, decorations, and medals of Malta